Clair-Mel City (Clair Mel) is an unincorporated community in Hillsborough County, Florida, United States. The community is combined with Palm River to form the census-designated place of Palm River-Clair Mel.

Geography 

Description
Clair Mel boundaries include Palm River to the west, Tampa city limits to the north, the Lee Roy Selmon Expressway to the east, and Progress Village to the south.

References

External links
Community of Clair-Mel City information page

Unincorporated communities in Hillsborough County, Florida
Unincorporated communities in Florida